2022 Malaysia Premier Futsal League (Women) was the eighth season of the Malaysia Premier Futsal League, the Malaysian professional futsal league for association football clubs, specifically for women since its establishment in 2007. 

Melaka F.A. won their first title.

Teams
 Melaka F.A.
 Selangor MBSA
 Sabah F.A.
 KL Prefer-Cyberlynx
 PDRM F.C.
 Kuala Lumpur

League table

References

Liga Futsal Kebangsaan seasons
2018 in Asian futsal
2018 in Malaysian football